Abel Oluwafemi Dosunmu, known as Mega 99, is a Nigerian gospel juju musician and songwriter.

Early life
Mega99 was born in Oshodi, a metropolitan city in Lagos State, the administrative division of Nigeria. 
He obtained a Bachelor of Science (B.Sc) degree in accountancy from Olabisi Onabanjo University.

Career 
In 1994, he established a musical group called Abel Dosunmu and the Mega 9'9 Band.
His debut album titled My mother was released in 1998 and another album titled Prayer was released in 2000 but was famous for his album titled Money which was released in 2004.
He later released "Ona Ara" in 2006 followed by "Weep Not" in 2008 and Thanksgiving in 2010. Another album titled Victory at last was released in 2012, Fear Not" in 2013 and Emajo Emayo was released in 2014.

Discography
My Mother (1998)
Prayer (2000)
Money (2003)
Ona Ara (2006)
Weep Not (2008)
Thanksgiving (2010)
Fear Not (2013)
Emajo Emayo (2014)

See also
 List of Nigerian gospel musicians

References

Living people
People from Lagos State
Nigerian gospel singers
Yoruba musicians
Musicians from Lagos
Olabisi Onabanjo University alumni
Yoruba-language singers
Year of birth missing (living people)